Diocese of San Diego may refer to:
 Episcopal Diocese of San Diego
 Roman Catholic Diocese of San Diego